Hopewell is an unincorporated community and former borough in Chester County, Pennsylvania, United States. It lies at an elevation of 344 feet (105 m). The village was incorporated as a borough in May 1853. After declining in the late 1800s, the borough was reabsorbed into East Nottingham and Lower Oxford townships in 1914.  It is home to the Hopewell Historic District, Hanover Farms, Hopewell UMC and BSA Troop 8.

History 
The village of Hopewell began when Samuel Dickey III settled in the area and built Hopewell Mill. Samuel & his brothers David & Ebenezer (father of John Miller Dickey) founded a company called S. E. & D. Dickey around 1816. The business began by selling cotton yarn produced by the mill but later grew to include a grist mill. The company also began to recruit skilled labor, such as carpentry and masonry, which drew talent and settlers to the village. Samuel Dickey died in 1835 and left his business to his sons. The Hopewell works continued to prosper, and the Dickey family petitioned the county government to grant Hopewell Borough status. The Borough of Hopewell was erected from Lower Oxford & East Nottingham Townships and incorporated in May 1853. The Hopewell Academy was founded in 1834 and later expanded to become a private preparatory school in 1841. The Academy offered lessons in Mathematics, Latin, Greek, botany, chemistry, and many other subjects. In 1860, the Hopewell Mill was the fourth most profitable mill in Chester County.

With the start of the American Civil War in April 1861, Hopewell began to decline. The Academy closed its doors in 1861, and the Dickey business, now called S.J. Dickey & Brothers, went bankrupt in 1862. With the failure of the Dickey Company, agriculture became the main driver of the Hopewell economy. The borough finally received a railroad connection in 1872 with the completion of the Peach Bottom Railway. Hopewell continued to decline as the local creamery closed in 1879. The grist mill burned down at this time, further damaging Hopewell's prospects. During the late 1800s, people began to ally themselves with the neighboring towns of Oxford and Nottingham, as opposed to Hopewell. By 1897, 35 of the 45 people eligible to vote held some borough office. Hopewell had become little more than a small cluster of buildings. Residents of Hopewell began petitioning the county government to revoke the borough charter in the mid-1890s, as they were unhappy with high borough taxes and the poor state of the village's roads. West Chester granted the petition in December 1913. The Borough of Hopewell ceased to exist starting in 1914, and its territory was returned to East Nottingham and Lower Oxford Townships.

Many of the buildings in the former borough, such as the Academy and Hopewell Post Office, are now contributing properties of the Hopewell Historic District.

References

Unincorporated communities in Chester County, Pennsylvania
Unincorporated communities in Pennsylvania